Frederick S. Mansfield (died 1922) was an American tennis player active in the late 19th century.

Mansfield reached the quarterfinals of the U.S. National Championships in 1886, 1887 and 1889. He won the Canadian International Championships in 1891.

External links 

1922 deaths
American male tennis players
Year of birth missing